John Warford (born 1946) is the former mayor of Bismarck, North Dakota. He was elected to office in 2002, was re-elected in 2006 and again in 2010, leaving office in 2014. Although the mayor's office is officially non-partisan, Warford identifies himself as Republican.

Dr. Warford is also an orthodontist, and was previously the president of the North Dakota Dental Association. He served on the Bismarck Municipal Airport Planning Committee and the University of Mary Executive Operations Committee of the Emerging Leaders in Health Care.

Dr. Warford has resided in Bismarck since 1973 and is married with four children.

References

Mayors of Bismarck, North Dakota
North Dakota Republicans
Living people
1947 births